The Silent House (also released as The House of Silence) is a 1929 British silent mystery film, directed by Walter Forde and starring Mabel Poulton, Gibb McLaughlin and Arthur Pusey. It was made in 1928 at the Nettlefold Studios in Walton-on-Thames and trade-shown in January 1929. The film was written by H Fowler Mear, based on a hit stage play by John G Brandon and George Pickett, but it was not a success at the box-office. A print of the film exists at the National Film Archive in London.

Chan Fu, the Oriental character played by Gibb McLaughlin, resembles Sax Rohmer's then-popular Fu Manchu character. Jonathan Rigby, in his book Studies in Terror, points out that "The film contains an almost de rigueur tribute to The Cat and the Canary when a corpse pitches forward from its concealment in a fireplace, as well as betraying a submerged uneasiness about Britain's colonial past that was to resurface in several British horrors of a later period."

Plot 
The film takes place in an 'old dark house' sporting hidden panels, clutching hands, a snake pit and a secret panel leading to a room used to conceal dead bodies. A Chinese mandarin named Chan Fu (Gibb McLaughlin) uses his Svengali-like powers to hypnotise a woman into revealing the hiding place of a cache of expensive bonds.

Cast
 Mabel Poulton as T'Mala 
 Gibb McLaughlin as Chan Fu 
 Arthur Pusey as George Winsford 
 Gerald Rawlinson as Captain Barty 
 Albert Brouett as Peroda 
 Rex Maurice as  Legarde 
 Raston Medrora as Mateo 
 Frank Perfitt as Richard Winsford 
 Arthur Stratton as Benson 
 Kiyoshi Takase as Ho-Fang

References

Bibliography
 Low, Rachel. The History of British Film: Volume IV, 1918–1929. Routledge, 1997.
 Wood, Linda. British Films, 1927-1939. British Film Institute, 1986.
 Rigby, Jonathan. Studies in Terror: Landmarks of Horror Cinema. Signum Books, 2011.

External links

1929 films
British mystery films
British silent feature films
1929 mystery films
Films directed by Walter Forde
Films shot at Nettlefold Studios
British films based on plays
British black-and-white films
Butcher's Film Service films
1920s English-language films
1920s British films
Silent mystery films